The women's 500 meter at the 2014 KNSB Dutch Single Distance Championships took place in Heerenveen at the Thialf ice skating rink on Saturday 26 November 2013. Although this edition was held in 2013, it was part of the 2013–2014 speed skating season.

There were 22 participants who raced twice over 500m so that all skaters had to start once in the inner lane and once in the outer lane. There was a qualification selection incentive for the next following 2013–14 ISU Speed Skating World Cup tournaments.

Title holder was Thijsje Oenema.

Overview

Result

Draw 1st 500m

Draw 2nd 500m

Source:

References

Single Distance Championships
2014 Single Distance
World